The following is a list of VMI Keydets basketball seasons. VMI competes in the Southern Conference of the NCAA's Division I. Since 1981, the Keydets have played their home games out of 5,800–seat Cameron Hall.

The history of VMI basketball dates back to 1908, with the formation of the school's first team. The Keydets played as an independent until 1918, when they joined the now-defunct South Atlantic Intercollegiate Athletic Association. Following the league's demise, VMI returned to playing as an independent before joining the Southern Conference in 1924, where they would remain for the next eighty years. VMI left the SoCon for the Big South Conference in 2003, but returned to the league in 2014.

VMI has won three conference championships in their history, all of them while in the Southern Conference. The first came in 1964 under head coach Weenie Miller, a season in which the Keydets upset Lefty Driesell and his top-ranked Davidson Wildcats in the SoCon Tournament. Later in 1976, VMI, led by Hall of Fame forward Ron Carter, achieved a 22–10 record en route to a conference championship and upset run to the Elite 8 round of the NCAA tournament. The Keydets advanced to the Sweet 16 the following year in 1977, and have not been to the NCAA tournament since. In 2014, however, VMI accepted an invitation to participate in the 2014 CollegeInsider.com Postseason Tournament, where they advanced to the semifinals before falling to Yale.

As of the end of the 2017–18 season, VMI has achieved an 894–1,515 all-time record since its inception in 1908.

Seasons

Postseason playoff results
The Keydets have appeared in three NCAA Tournaments, all by way of winning their conference tournament and the subsequent automatic bid. VMI made two upset tournament runs in 1976 and 1977 which culminated in Elite Eight and Sweet Sixteen appearances, respectively. After a 37-year postseason drought, VMI accepted an invitation to participate in the 2014 CollegeInsider.com Postseason Tournament. A field of 32 teams, the Keydets won three games and lost in the semifinal round of the tournament.

Statistics
Statistics correct as of the end of the 2017–18 NCAA Division I men's basketball season

References
General
2013–14 VMI Basketball Fact Book
Specific

 
VMI
VMI Keydets basketball seasons